Chinese citizen refers to a citizen of the People's Republic of China (PRC) under Chinese nationality law
Mainland China
Resident Identity Card, granted to PRC citizens who are also permanent residents of mainland China
Chinese passport, granted to PRC citizens who are also permanent residents of mainland China

Special administrative regions of China
Hong Kong Special Administrative Region passport, granted to PRC citizens who are also permanent residents of Hong Kong
Macau Special Administrative Region passport, granted to PRC citizens who are also permanent residents of Macau

See also
Chinese (disambiguation)
National identification card (Taiwan), granted to citizens of the Republic of China (ROC), now commonly known as Taiwan